Howzat! is the fifth studio album by Australian rock band, Sherbet. released in June 1976. It spent two weeks at number one on the Australian albums chart in 1976.

At the Australian 1976 King of Pop Awards the album won Most Popular Australian Album.

Reception
Cash Box magazine said "Their sound is a bit pop-ish, but the somewhat heavy-handed treatment of the instrumentation lends just enough punch to make Howzat! a solid choice for the FM programmer as well. We highly recommend the title track and 'Blueswalkin' to the progressive programmer, while 'Dancer' will supplement these just fine in the pop markets."

Track listing

Personnel 
Sherbet
Daryl Braithwaite - vocals, backing vocals, tambourine
Harvey James - electric guitar, acoustic guitar, backing vocals, vocals (11)
Tony Mitchell - bass, ukulele (11), backing vocals, vocals (11)
Alan Sandow - drums, percussion, vocals (11)
Garth Porter - keyboard, backing vocals, vocals (5, 11), saxophone (7)

Charts
Weekly charts

Year-end charts

Release history

References

Sherbet (band) albums
1976 albums
Albums produced by Richard Lush
Albums produced by Clive Shakespeare
Albums produced by Garth Porter
Epic Records albums
Festival Records albums
Infinity Records albums
MCA Records albums